Edward George Gray (1924–1999) was a British anatomist and neuroscientist who pioneered the investigation of neural tissues with transmission electron microscopy. During his professional career, Gray made a number of profound contributions to our knowledge of synaptic structure. To this day, synapses are classified according to their ultrastructure as Gray type 1 (symmetric) or type 2 (asymmetric), corresponding to inhibitory and excitatory synapses.

Life and major contributions 
Edward G. Gray came to the Anatomy Department at University College London (UCL) in 1955 to work as a postdoctoral assistant to John Z. Young. In 1959, he published a seminal paper on the synaptic structure in mammalian neocortex, describing a specialized organelle inside dendritic spines that he named the spine apparatus. In 1962, he published a method for isolating synaptosomes which are isolated axon terminals purified by centrifugation. In 1970, he described the clathrin coats of recycling vesicles and proposed that the coats provide a scaffold that determines the vesicle size. He became a Fellow of the Royal Society in 1976. In his later years, he suffered from severe clinical depression.

References 

1924 births
British anatomists
1999 deaths
Fellows of the Royal Society